Martha Leticia Rivera Cisneros (born 30 October 1965) is a Mexican politician affiliated with the National Action Party. As of 2014 she served as Senator of the LX Legislature of the Mexican Congress representing Morelos as replacement of Sergio Álvarez Mata. She also served as Deputy during the LIX Legislature.

References

1965 births
Living people
People from Chihuahua (state)
Women members of the Senate of the Republic (Mexico)
Members of the Senate of the Republic (Mexico)
Members of the Chamber of Deputies (Mexico)
National Action Party (Mexico) politicians
21st-century Mexican politicians
21st-century Mexican women politicians
Women members of the Chamber of Deputies (Mexico)